is a Japanese politician who served as Minister of Health, Labour and Welfare under Prime Minister Junichirō Koizumi.

Kawasaki was born in Iga, Mie. His father and grandfather were both politicians.

He attended Keio University and graduated with a degree in Commerce. After several years working at Matsushita, Kawasaki won a seat in the House of Representatives, representing Mie Prefecture in 1980.

Kawasaki is a long-time rival of Hiroshi Nakai of the Democratic Party of Japan, and the two have repeatedly challenged each other for seats representing Mie in the Diet.

He served as Minister of Transportation under Keizō Obuchi, and later as Director of the Hokkaido Development Agency. On October 31, 2005, Junichirō Koizumi chose Kawasaki to head the Ministry of Health, Labor and Welfare.

Quotes

"We must regret having given him (Horie) too much credit." Asahi Shimbun January 25, 2006

“I do not think that Japan should ever become a multi-ethnic society.” The New York Times, April 22, 2009.

References

|-

|-

1947 births
Ministers of Health, Labour and Welfare of Japan
Keio University alumni
Living people
Politicians from Mie Prefecture
21st-century Japanese politicians